Robin Le Poidevin (born 1962) is Emeritus Professor of Metaphysics at the University of Leeds, whose special interests include agnosticism, philosophy of religion, metaphysics, and philosophy of space and time.

Biography

Le Poidevin was educated at Repton School and Oriel College Oxford, where he graduated with a B.A. (1984, converted to M.A., 1988) in Psychology and Philosophy. He took a Ph.D. in Philosophy at Emmanuel College, Cambridge (1989). He was Gifford Research Fellow in Logic and Metaphysics at the University of St Andrews, 1988-89. He was appointed to a lectureship in Philosophy at the University of Leeds in 1989, where he taught until 2022. He was the 2007 Stanton Lecturer in Philosophy of Religion at the University of Cambridge and the 2012 Alan Richardson Fellow in Theology at the University of Durham. From 2010 to 2015 he was Editor of Religious Studies, and is a past President of the British Society for the Philosophy of Religion.

Le Poidevin has defended both agnosticism and religious fictionalism in his writings on religion, and the B-theory of time (which denies the reality of temporal passage) in his writings on metaphysics.

Publications

Books
 Change, Cause and Contradiction: A Defence of the Tenseless Theory of Time, London: Macmillan, 1991. 
 Arguing for Atheism: An Introduction to the Philosophy of Religion, London: Routledge, 1996. 
 Travels in Four Dimensions: The Enigmas of Space and Time, Oxford: Oxford University Press, 2003. 
 The Images of Time: An Essay on Temporal Representation, Oxford: Oxford University Press, 2007. 
 Agnosticism: A Very Short Introduction, Oxford: Oxford University Press, 2010. 
 Religious Fictionalism, Cambridge: Cambridge University Press, 2019. 
 And Was Made Man: Mind, Metaphysics and Incarnation, Oxford: Oxford University Press, 2023.

Edited Volumes 
 The Philosophy of Time (co-edited with Murray MacBeath), Oxford: Oxford University Press, 1993. 
 Questions of Time and Tense, Oxford: Oxford University Press, 1998. 
 Being: Developments in Contemporary Metaphysics, Cambridge: Cambridge University Press, 2006. 
 The Routledge Companion to Metaphysics (co-edited with Peter Simons, Ross Cameron and Andrew McGonigal, London: Routledge, 2009. ISBN 9780415396318

Essays (selected) 
 The Experience and Perception of Time (Stanford Encyclopedia of Philosophy)
 ‘Why I am Agnostic’, in Mark Lamport, ed, The Rowman and Littlefield Handbook of Philosophy and Religion, Lanham: Rowman and Littlefield, 2022.
 For a fuller list, see:
 Robin Le Poidevin (University of Leeds) - PhilPeople
 Robin Le Poidevin - Google Scholar

References

External links
Robin Le Poidevin homepage on the Leeds University website

1962 births
Living people
20th-century British philosophers
21st-century British philosophers
Academics of the University of Leeds
Atheist philosophers
British atheists
Critics of religions
Metaphysicians
Philosophers of religion
Philosophers of time
Rationalists